"It's Alright, It's OK" is a song by Ashley Tisdale from her second studio album, Guilty Pleasure. The song was written by Niclas Molinder, Joacim Persson, and David Jassy, while Molinder and Persson also produced the track. It was released as the album's lead single in the United States and Canada on April 14, 2009, being released in other countries in the following week. A CD single was released in numerous countries, including the United States, Canada, Germany, and the United Kingdom. Lyrically, the song's theme of heartache and a bad relationship are similar to her previous works, as well as several other tracks featured on Tisdale's second album.

The single received positive critical feedback, as was the change in musical direction. The song became Tisdale's fourth single to chart on the Billboard Hot 100, where it peaked at number 99. It became her first Top 20 hit on the Hot Dance Club Play chart, peaking at number 19, her highest peak to date on the chart. The song fared better in other territories, entering the Top 40 in both Sweden and on the Eurochart Hot 100 Singles. "It's Alright, It's OK" was Tisdale's first top five hit in Austria, and is her highest peaking single to date in the country. The song was Tisdale's third to enter the Top 20 in Germany, and is her highest peaking single in that country as well. The song's music video features Tisdale finding out that her boyfriend is cheating on her, so she decides to hook up with various men and take pictures with them. She later trashes her ex-boyfriend's house and lets him find the pictures. Various shots of Tisdale and her band performing the song at a party are also shown.

Tisdale promoted the single mainly through live performances, most of which were televised. The song was performed on American talk shows such as Good Morning America and The Today Show, while Tisdale also promoted the song with live performances at international show's including Wetten, dass..? and at Los Premios MTV Latinoamérica 2009. DJ Cansis recorded a dance cover version of the song, under the title "OK Alright". The cover version was released in Europe in 2010, and was later featured on the Love2Club compilation album in the country. The track is the theme song of the German television show "Die Schulermittler".

Background and composition

"It's Alright, It's OK" was written by top songwriter/producer Joacim Persson, Niclas Molinder and produced by Swedish music production team Twin. On the song's message, Tisdale said the song "is a strong, empowering song that kind of helps you move on" and continued to say, "I have definitely on and with someone you really like, if they are cheating on you, you don't want to believe it. But, unfortunately, you either stay in the relationship and keep getting hurt because it keeps happening or you get up and you move on. You don't look back". The song was released as the album's lead single on April 14, 2009 in the United States in airplay and digital formats. Tisdale premiered the single on On Air with Ryan Seacrest. She described the song as a message she wanted to get across the other girls. The song was played on KIIS-FM in Los Angeles and WIHT in Washington D.C. The official remixes were by Dave Audé, Johnny Vicious, Jason Nevins and Von Doom; the Audé remix used a sample of Depeche Mode's "Personal Jesus" as most of the backing track, and the Von Doom remix used one of "Hot n Cold" by Katy Perry. The song is included in the compilation albums The Dome Summer 2009 and Bravo Hits Vol.66.

The song is a spunky break-up anthem about being single and in control of your life for the first time.— "I love break-up songs," Tisdale admits during the press release of the single. She described the song as a message she wanted to get across the other girls.

Critical reception
Nick Levine of Digital Spy said:
'It's Alright, It's OK', the lead single from album number two, is certainly a step in the right direction. It sees Tisdale come across like Kelly Clarkson's spunky little sister, delivering an "I'm so much better without you" message over a radio-friendly pop/rock backing. There's nothing remotely original here, but the big chanty chorus hits the spot like a slice of pizza after a heavy night out.().

Stephanie Bruzzese of Commonsense Media stated:

Her message about lost love will undoubtedly strike a chord with many of her young fans who've experienced their own heartaches. The uncomplicated lyrics give an honest yet clean account of getting over someone who's deceived you....Cookie-cutter is the term that comes to mind when listening to this track...Tisdale's voice is passable exceptional...The mildly catchy hooks sound a lot like those in Kelly Clarkson's single "My Life Would Suck Without You", but because Tisdale's vocal chops are nowhere near as strong as Clarkson's, this single lacks overall oomfph.".

Chart performance
The song debuted on the Billboard Hot 100 chart of May 2, 2009, at number 99. In May 2009, the song debuted on the Canadian Hot 100 at number 85 and then climbed at number 74 due to high downloads. The song entered the Eurochart Hot 100 Singles at number 43 and then rose to number 38 in its third week. In the United Kingdom, the song reached the number 104. In Germany, the song debuted at number 13 and later rose to number 12, and in Austria the song peaked at number five. The song stayed on the Austrian and German chart for 16 and 11 consecutive weeks. The song entered the Czech Singles Chart at number 76 and peaked at number 37 and stayed on the chart for 31 consecutive weeks, making it the song's longest run.

Music video
The music video was shot on March 24, 2009 in a Beverly Hills mansion and directed by Scott Speer, the music video features Adam Gregory, as Tisdale's ex-boyfriend who cheats on her. In the video, the man who has supposedly cheated on Tisdale leaves his house and she finds a key, so she goes into his house. There she takes photographs with Edilson Nascimento, Christopher Mason and other Brazilian male models, as well as Scott Speer. She then throws a party there, where her band then stages a performance on platforms in the swimming pool. At the end of the video, the man that cheated on her, comes home with the 'second' girlfriend (portrayed by Brittany Snow) and they find a camera with a note with "It's Alright, It's OK" written in it (made by Tisdale). His "second" girlfriend then leaves him. The video premiered on MySpace and Entertainment Tonight. The music video was shown in 6,600 movie theaters in the United States from April 24 to May 28.

Live performances

On May 17, 2009, Tisdale performed for first time the song at the special 2009 KISS Concert hosted by WXKS-FM of Boston, Massachusetts. Tisdale performed the song for the annual award ceremony of the Viva Comet Awards, celebrated in Cologne, Germany on May 29, 2009. During her first promotional tour of her album and her clothes line Puerco Espin for Europe, she sang the song on June 9, 2009 at TRL Italy in Rimini, Italy and Operación Triunfo in Madrid, Spain on June 11, 2009, also in Spain she performed it for the German TV show Wetten, dass..? on June 13, 2009.

Her first live performance for U.S. TV was in ABC's Good Morning America, where she performed the track along with "Masquerade" on June 16, 2009, as part of the anticipated promotion for her second album. In the release week of Guilty Pleasure, Tisdale sang "It's Alright, It's OK" in several American TV shows such as NBC's Today Show and ABC's The View. Also, the song was included in the track list for her free concerts across United States, and she recorded live versions of the song for AOL Sessions and Walmart Soundckeck. On August 21, 2009, she was invited to perform the song in the NBC's show America's Got Talent. On October 4, 2009, she was guest star in an episode of Extreme Makeover: Home Edition, here she performed the song too. On October 15, 2009, Tisdale was part of the ceremony awards with this song at Los Premios MTV Latinoamérica 2009.

Track listing

Maxi CD
 "It's Alright, It's OK" (Album Version)—2:59
 "Guilty Pleasure" (Non-Album Track)—3:16
 "It's Alright, It's OK" (Dave Audé Club Mix)—6:58
 "It's Alright, It's OK" (Johnny Vicious Club Mix)—7:58
 "It's Alright, It's OK" (Enhanced Music Video)—3:15

2-Track single
 "It's Alright, It's OK" (Album Version)—2:59
 "Guilty Pleasure" (Non-Album Track)—3:16

Remixes EP
 "It's Alright, It's OK" (Dave Audé Radio)—3:57
 "It's Alright, It's OK" (Johnny Vicious Radio)—3:19
 "It's Alright, It's OK" (Von Doom Radio)—4:15

Wal-Mart CD single
 "It's Alright, It's OK" (Album Version)—2:59
 "It's Alright, It's OK" (Enhanced Music Video)—3:15

Charts

Year-end charts

Credits and Personnel

Song credits
 Lead vocals – Ashley Tisdale
 Producer – Twin and Alke
 Vocal producer – Kelly Levesque
 Writer (s) – Niclas Molinder, Joacim Persson, Johan Alkenäs, David Jassy
 Background vocals – Sibel Redžep
 Recording engineer – Brian Summer
 Assistant mix engineer – Matty Green
 Guitarist (s) – Joacim Persson, Johan Alkenäs
 Bass – Niclas Bosson

CD single credits
 Executive Producers – Lori Feldman, Tom Whalley
 A&R – Tommy Page
 Art Direction – Julian Peploe
 Photography – Roberto D'Este

Release history

Cover version
 In 2010 The song was covered by the DJ Cansis on a dance version called "OK Alright", and was included in the compilation album Love2Club, along with others Europeans hits singles.

References

2009 singles
Ashley Tisdale songs
Music videos directed by Scott Speer
Songs written by David Jassy
2008 songs
Songs written by Niclas Molinder
Songs written by Joacim Persson
Song recordings produced by Twin (production team)
Warner Records singles
Songs written by Johan Alkenäs